Labor or worker mobility is the geographical and occupational movement of workers. Impediments to mobility are easily divided into two distinct classes with one being personal and the other being systemic. Personal impediments include physical location, and physical and mental ability. The systemic impediments include educational opportunities as well as various laws and political contrivances and even barriers and hurdles arising from historical happenstance.

Increasing and maintaining a high level of labor mobility allows a more efficient allocation of resources and greater productivity.

International labor mobility

International labor mobility is the movement of workers between countries. It is an example of an international factor movement. The movement of laborers is based on a difference in resources between countries. According to economists, over time the migration of labor should have an equalizing effect on wages, with workers in the same industries garnering the same wage.

See also
Relocation service
Human resources
Global mobility

References

External links
 European Commission'Study on workers'mobility : Short-term international assignments - Final Report 2009

Labour economics